Stimpsonia may refer to:
 Stimpsonia (plant), a genus of plants in the family Primulaceae
 Stimpsonia, a genus of amphipods in the family Aoridae, synonym of Microdeutopus
 Stimpsonia, a genus of crustaceans in the family Xanthidae, synonym of Lipkemedaeus